The Sweet James Jones Stories is the debut solo studio album by American rapper Pimp C. It was released on March 1, 2005 through Rap-A-Lot Records, Asylum Records and Atlantic Records. Recording sessions took place at Dean's List House of Hits, Noddfactor Studios and Hiroshima Studios. Composed of fourteen tracks, the production was handled by eleven record producers, including Mike Dean, Mr. Lee and N.O. Joe. The album features guest appearances from ABN, Bun B, Cory Mo, Devin the Dude, Lil' Flip and Twista.

There also exists a bootleg version of the album, with a slightly different track listing, recorded by Pimp C while he was in jail.

Track listing

Personnel

Chad Lamont Butler – main artist, producer (track 1), A&R
Joseph Wayne McVey IV – featured artist (tracks: 4, 5, 14)
Wesley Eric Weston Jr. – featured artist (track 4)
Bernard James Freeman – featured artist (track 5), executive producer
Carl Terrell Mitchell – featured artist (track 5)
Cory Moore – featured artist (track 8), producer (tracks: 8, 12, 13)
Devin Copeland – featured artist (track 11)
Frazier Othel Thompson III – featured artist (track 14)
Michael George Dean – producer (tracks: 3, 7, 8, 10, 13), mixing, mastering
Daniel Castillo – producer (tracks: 7, 9, 11, 12)
Leroy Williams, Jr. – producer (tracks: 1, 6)
Dorie Lee Dorsey – producer (tracks: 4, 14)
Wendell Springer – producer (track 2)
John Okuribido – producer (track 2)
DeJuan Dee Durriseau – producer (track 3)
Joseph Johnson – producer (track 5)
Terius Gray – producer (track 8)
James A. Smith – executive producer
"Riley B" Broussard – production coordinator
Anzel U. Jennings – A&R
Tony Randle – A&R

Charts

References

External links

Pimp C albums
2005 debut albums
Rap-A-Lot Records albums
Albums produced by N.O. Joe
Albums produced by Mike Dean (record producer)